Senna Sandra Deriks (born 30 December 2000) is a Belgian female artistic gymnast, representing her nation in international competitions. She finished third with the Belgian squad at the 2016  Gymnastics Olympic Test Event, and eventually qualified for the 2016 Summer Olympics, finishing twelfth alongside her fellow gymnasts Nina Derwael, Rune Hermans, Gaëlle Mys, and Laura Waem in the qualification phase of the team all-around tournament.

References

External links 
 

2000 births
Living people
Belgian female artistic gymnasts
People from Rotselaar
Gymnasts at the 2016 Summer Olympics
Olympic gymnasts of Belgium
Belgian women gymnasts
European Games competitors for Belgium
Gymnasts at the 2019 European Games
Sportspeople from Flemish Brabant